Amherst is a town in northwestern Nova Scotia, Canada, located at the northeast end of the Cumberland Basin, an arm of the Bay of Fundy, and  south of the Northumberland Strait.

History

According to Dr. Graham P. Hennessey, "The Micmac name was Nemcheboogwek meaning 'going up rising ground', in reference to the higher land to the east of the Tantramar Marshes. The Acadians who settled here as early as 1672 called the village Les Planches. The village was later renamed Amherst by Colonel Joseph Morse in honour of Lord Amherst, the commander-in-chief of the British Army in North America during the Seven Years' War."

These settlers were joined by United Empire Loyalists (Loyalists who fled the American colonies during the American Revolution). A mill was built on the current townsite, and the residents moved there to be closer to work.

During the 19th century, Amherst became an important regional centre for shipbuilding and other services to outlying communities.  An indication of the town's importance in Canadian history is seen with its four Fathers of Confederation:  Edward B. Chandler, Robert B. Dickey, Jonathan McCully, and Sir Charles Tupper.

During the late 19th century, local industrialists and entrepreneurs constructed many fine Victorian and Edwardian homes along Victoria Street East, leading toward the farming hamlet of East Amherst.  Many notable residents have lived in this district, including Tupper, Senator Thomas R. Black, the Barker Family, the Lamy Family, the Pugsley Family and Mary (Molly) Simmons Critchley.

Amherst gained brief notoriety in the late 19th century as the location of alleged poltergeist phenomena afflicting Amherst resident Esther Cox in 1878 and 1879, which became known as the Great Amherst Mystery after the publication of a popular book on the affair.

Amherst experienced unprecedented industrialization in the late 1870s after the Intercolonial Railway of Canada constructed its main line from Halifax to Quebec through the town in 1872.  The location of the railway line away from the Bay of Fundy coast further consolidated the town at its present location as industry and commercial activity centred around this important transportation link.  The economic boom created by the arrival of the Intercolonial Railway lasted through World War I and numerous foundries, factories and mills opened, giving rise to the nickname "Busy Amherst".

In 1908, the manufacturing output of Amherst's industries was not exceeded by any centre in the Maritime Provinces. Many of the fine old buildings along Victoria Street are considered industrial artifacts because they were constructed during a period of tremendous industry growth. Local contractors employed local craftsmen, who used local materials. Notice the emphasis on sandstone and brick, both locally produced and delightful detail which reflects the skilled craftsmanship prevalent in the 19th century.

Amherst's prosperity would not last as the failed economic policies of the federal and provincial governments, coupled with World War I, saw the town's industrial economy begin a slow decline during the 1910s. The Amherst Internment Camp for prisoners of war and enemy aliens was set up at Malleable Iron Foundry in Amherst from April 1915 to September 1919, and Russian revolutionary Leon Trotsky was incarcerated there for one month after he was arrested in Halifax, Nova Scotia in April 1917.

During the Amherst general strike in 1919, worker unrest over social and economic conditions led to mass protests in sympathy with the Winnipeg general strike.

The eventual closure of companies such as Robb Engineering & Manufacturing (purchased by Canada Car and Foundry and then closed) and Amherst Pianos, among others led to a resignation of lost dreams as the town was overtaken by other newer manufacturing centres in central Canada during the 20th century.  Amherst had a modest-sized industrial park constructed during the 1960s when the Trans-Canada Highway was being developed.  Today the majority of the town's major employers are located there, including Emmerson Packaging and IMP Aerospace.

In 2002, the Cumberland Regional Health Care Centre opened on the outskirts of the town, replacing the older Highland View Regional Hospital on Pleasant Street.

The town is currently served by Via Rail's Halifax-to-Montreal train Ocean.

Businesses
Amherst is the retail centre for the Cumberland region and the southeastern part of Westmorland County (New Brunswick).  The town has several national retailers including Walmart, Sobeys, Atlantic Superstore, Canadian Tire, Kent Building Supplies, Giant Tiger, Dollarama, Home Hardware, and Hart, in addition to various fast food restaurants and seven auto dealerships. The Amherst Centre Mall is home to retailers Coles, Northern Reflections, Mark's, Eclipse, Charm Diamonds, Bell Aliant, Telus, and EastLink, as well as the Amherst Artisan Gallery.

The heritage downtown draws visitors to speciality retailers Deanne Fitzpatrick Studio, Mrs. Pugsley's Emporium, and Birkinshaw's Tea Room. Dayle's Grand Market houses several businesses in a historic department store with a grand staircase and tin ceilings. Shops include an antique coin dealer, a vintage clothing shop, a ladies clothing and shoe store, and a collaboration of more than 100 local artisans.

Sports
Amherst is home of the Amherst Ramblers,  a Junior A Hockey League team from the Maritime Hockey League. All home games are played out of the 2,500 seat Amherst Stadium. The season usually runs from mid-September to early March every year. The Ramblers draw some of the largest crowds in the Maritime Hockey League, and have placed third in average attendance over the past few years. They won the Atlantic Championship in 1989 advancing to the Centennial Cup tournament in BC. They also hosted the Centennial Cup in 1993 and the Fred Page Cup in 2019.

Every August, Amherst hosts an eight-team little league baseball tournament, featuring four teams from New England.

Climate 

Amherst experiences a humid continental climate (Dfb). In 2020, Amherst only recorded  of precipitation.

Demographics 

In the period between 1996 and 2006, Amherst lost over half of its Black population. The African Nova Scotian community has lived in the area since 1783, largely settled around the south end of the town in an area called Sand Hill.

Notable citizens

 Roger Stuart Bacon, former Premier of Nova Scotia
 Willard Boyle, co-inventor of the charge-coupled device (CCD), for which he shared a 2009 Nobel Prize in Physics
 Bill Casey, politician
 Edward Barron Chandler, politician
 Robert C. Coates, politician
 Alex Colville, Painter
 George Cove, inventor
 George Barton Cutten, university president
 Robert Barry Dickey, politician
 Leslie Feist, musician
 John Greer, sculptor
 Carly Jackson, professional ice hockey player 
 Rocky Johnson, professional wrestler, WWE Hall of Fame inductee, father of Dwayne "The Rock" Johnson
 Jonathan McCully, politician
 Willard M. Mitchell, artist and architect
 William Thomas Pipes, former Premier of Nova Scotia
 Edgar Nelson Rhodes, former Premier of Nova Scotia
 Bill Riley, third Black player to play in the NHL
 Alfred Paul Rogers, American Orthodontist
 Norman McLeod Rogers, politician
 Sir Charles Tupper, 6th Prime Minister of Canada

Media

Television
Amherst is served locally by EastLink TV.  The station also serves the communities of Springhill, Oxford, and others in the county, as well as Sackville, New Brunswick.

Radio
 90.1 FM CFNS
 99.1 FM CITA
 101.7 FM CKDH
 107.9 FM CFTA (Tantramar FM)

Newspapers
 Amherst News (weekly)
 Citizen - Record (weekly)

See also
 List of municipalities in Nova Scotia

References

Notes

External links

 Town of Amherst

 
Populated coastal places in Canada
Towns in Nova Scotia